Pierre Henri Édouard Bocher (16 February 1811, Paris - 2 May 1900, Paris) was a French politician.

Life

Édouard Bocher was born on 16 February 1811 in Paris, son of a Paris stockbroker.
He was among the twenty founders of the Conférence Molé debating society on 19 March 1832.
Four of them later became members of the Council of State including Prosper Hochet, Mortimer Ternaux, Achille Guilhem and Édouard Bocher.
he became auditor to the Conseil d'État in 1833 and sub-prefect for Étampes in 1834. In 1834 he married Aline de Laborde (1811-1885), second daughter of comte Alexandre de Laborde and an accomplished lady of letters. They had two children:

Emmanuel Bocher (1835-1919), officer, writer, pianist, painter, editor of the complete works of Gavarni and great friend of Sarah Bernhardt
Valentin Bocher (1840-1849)

In 1839 Édouard Bocher was made prefect for Gers, then in 1841 for Toulouse and in 1842 for Caen. In 1848 he stopped being prefect for Calvados and in 1849 he became deputy for that department, sitting on the right. He protested against the 1851 coup. Opposed to the Second French Empire, he and others were put in charge of dealing with the property of Louis-Philippe I and his family.

In 1871 he was elected to represent Calvados, sitting in the centre-right group, of which he became president. He was senator for Calvados from 1876 to 1894, sitting on the right.

A great book collector, he assembled a remarkable collection of rare books. He was a close friend of Alfred de Musset, who dedicated one of his first poems to him.

References

Bibliography

François d'Ormesson and Jean-Pierre Thomas, Jean-Joseph de Laborde, banquier de Louis XV, mécène des Lumières, Paris, Perrin, 2002, p. 294-295 -

1811 births
1900 deaths
Politicians from Paris
Members of the National Legislative Assembly of the French Second Republic
French Senators of the Third Republic
Senators of Calvados (department)
Prefects of Gers
Prefects of Calvados (department)
French book and manuscript collectors
Burials at Père Lachaise Cemetery